The superficial palmar branch of the radial artery arises from the radial artery, just where this vessel is about to wind around the lateral side of the wrist.

Running forward, it passes through, occasionally over, the thenar muscles, which it supplies, and sometimes anastomoses with the terminal portion of the ulnar artery, completing the superficial palmar arch.

This vessel varies considerably in size: usually it is very small, and ends in the muscles of the thumb; sometimes it is as large as the continuation of the radial artery itself.

References 

Arteries of the upper limb